Haematophilia or hematophilia may refer to:
Haemophilia, a mostly inherited genetic disorder that impairs the body's ability to make blood clots, a process needed to stop bleeding  
Vampire lifestyle, an alternative lifestyle and subculture based around the mythology of and popular culture based on vampires